Kentucky Rumbler is a wooden roller coaster at Beech Bend Park in Warren County, Kentucky.  It has a drop of 80 feet and a height of 96 feet. Before Kentucky Rumbler, the park did not have a signature ride, and it is the most popular ride in the park.

Voted the 5th best new ride in 2006 by Amusement Today, the Kentucky Rumbler broke records and set others when it opened.

History
Between 2000 and 2005 many improvements were made and many features were added to the park. By the end of 2005, 40 rides had been added, including the new coaster the Wild Mouse, 500 campground spaces with modern amenities, renovated racing facilities, a water park and picnic pavilions.

The Jones family started talking about adding a wooden roller coaster to their park years before the Kentucky Rumbler was built. After they decided, Dallas Jones contacted Great Coasters International. 

Vice President of Sales & Design Jeff Pike started working for GCII after college, under the tutelage of Mike Boodley. The Kentucky Rumbler was Pike's first solo design. 

The Rye Aeroplane is a long-defunct coaster in the city of Rye, New York. It served as the inspiration for parts of the ride, including the first drop. The Rumbler's first drop is a mirror Image of the Aeroplane Coasters.

On October 28, 2005 the park officially named their new wooden roller coaster “Kentucky Rumbler”. Derek Sailors from Surfside Beach, South Carolina, was the winner of the contest to name the ride. Beech Bend received thousands of entries for the contest from all over the world.

The Kentucky Rumbler opened in 2006 to great reviews. It was ranked in the Top Five New Rides in the World by Amusement Today magazine, for 2006.

Design 
Highlights of the ride include a world record three station fly-bys and an airplane style first drop. It reaches speeds of almost 50 miles per hour and features 30 track crossovers and twelve airtime hills. 

The ride cost 4.6 million dollars. It is a wooden twister (bobs) coaster with a capacity of 480 guests per hour.

It has one vintage style 24 passenger Millennium Flyer train, made up of 12 cars, that each seat two riders.

The maximum height is 96 feet with the first drop of 80.2 feet. Ride Time is approximately 90 seconds. The Track Length is 2,827 feet.

The Kentucky Rumbler was constructed with 80,000 bolts and 1.5 million nails.

Awards

Note: Kentucky Rumbler has not charted in the Golden Ticket Awards since 2017.

References

Roller coasters in Kentucky
Roller coasters introduced in 2006